Bruna Bertolini (16 January 1909 - date of death unknown) was an Italian female basketball player, shot putter, discus thrower and long jumper, who won thirteen national championships at individual senior level from 1928 to 1937 in three different specialities, and gold medal at the EuroBasket Women 1938.

Biography
She was the sister of Nerina Bertolini, player of the Italy women's national basketball team like her, The two sisters played together four national appearances at the EuroBasket Women 1938 that was held in Rome.

National titles
Bruna Bertolini has won 10 consecutive national titles in the shot put, and this is the record in Italy.
 Italian Athletics Championships
 Standing long jump: 1931 (1)
 Shot put: 1928, 1929, 1930, 1931, 1932, 1933, 1934, 1935, 1936, 1937 (10)
 Discus throw: 1933, 1934 (2)

See also
 EuroBasket Women 1938 squads

References

External links
 La nazionale femminile dal 1938 al 1957 

1909 births
Year of death missing
Date of death unknown
Italian female discus throwers
Italian female long jumpers
Italian female shot putters
Italian women's basketball players
European champions for Italy
FIBA EuroBasket-winning players
20th-century Italian women